The Fraser Health Authority (FHA) is one of five publicly funded health authorities into which the Canadian province of British Columbia (BC) is divided. It is governed by the provincial Health Authorities Act.

History
Fraser Health was created in December 2001 as part of a province-wide restructuring of health authorities by the then-new BC Liberal government of Premier Gordon Campbell. It is the merger of three former health regions: Simon Fraser Health Region (SFHR), South Fraser Health Region, and the Fraser Valley Health Region (FVHR).

SFHR had been formed in 1996 by the merger of the Fraser–Burrard Hospital Society (Royal Columbian Hospital, Eagle Ridge Hospital and Ridge Meadows Hospital) with the Burnaby Health Region (Burnaby Hospital) and the extended care facilities operated by the Pacific Health Care Society (Queen's Park Care Centre and Fellburn Care Centre).

Demographics
It has 29,000 employees and serves the region from Boston Bar in the Fraser Canyon down the Fraser River Valley to the Vancouver suburbs of Burnaby and Delta. It is the largest health authority by population in British Columbia (BC). Its 1.9 million residents include approximately 62,000 Indigenous people associated with 32 First Nation bands and 5 Métis chartered communities.

Three rapidly growing communities also included in Fraser Health are Abbotsford, Maple Ridge, and Surrey; all three are served by expanding community-focused acute-care hospitals and related services.

Fraser Health provides health care services for the following communities:

The region's population portion against vaccination occasionally contributes to outbreaks of infectious diseases, such as the 2014 measles outbreak of 320 cases, the most in BC history. In 2021-2022, Fraser Health received a $1,064,107 grant from the Public Health Agency of Canada's Immunization Partnership Fund to promote vaccine coverage among 2-year-olds in the regions of Surrey and Chilliwack from vulnerable populations such as Indigenous, immigrant, hard-to-reach and low income family groups.

Between Aug. 1, 2017, and July 31, 2018, Fraser Health performed over 91,000 surgeries and postponed nearly 2,300 operations on the day of surgery.

Facilities and services
Services provided by Fraser Health include primary health care, community home care, mental health and addictions, acute medical, and surgical services.

Fraser Health has 13 acute-care hospitals including 3 regional hospitals and 9 community hospitals as well as an outpatient care and surgery centre.

Regional hospitals 
 Abbotsford Regional Hospital and Cancer Centre
 Royal Columbian Hospital
 Surrey Memorial Hospital

Community hospitals 
 Burnaby Hospital
 Chilliwack General Hospital
 Delta Hospital
 Eagle Ridge Hospital
 Fraser Canyon Hospital
 Langley Memorial Hospital
 Mission Memorial Hospital
 Peace Arch Hospital
 Ridge Meadows Hospital

Outpatient care and surgery centre 
Jim Pattison Outpatient Care and Surgery Centre

Community sites 
Fraser Health has approximately 110 community sites delivering health care services.

The Royal Columbian Hospital, located in the city of New Westminster, is the oldest hospital in British Columbia and one of Fraser Health's busiest. A major tertiary-care facility known for trauma care, neurosurgery and open-heart surgery, the Royal Columbian Hospital has the only program in British Columbia capable of performing cardiac surgery for expectant women. In September 2018, it was announced that Fraser Health had purchased two private MRI clinics in Surrey, British Columbia, and Abbotsford, British Columbia.

According to the Chilliwack Progress in 2019, home-support clients within Fraser Health would have their care directly managed by the health authority. The change is being made because contracts with external service providers for home support services are set to expire in March 2020.

Partnerships 
Fraser Health is a corporate partner of the Canadian Association of Emergency Physicians.

Governance
The board of directors functions as Fraser Health's governing body, and oversees the conduct of the organization's business through the executive team, which is responsible for the day-to-day operations. Board members are appointed by the Minister of Health through the provincial Board Resourcing and Development Office. Prior to the 2001 regionalization, communities elected board representatives.

See also

Other regional health authorities in British Columbia 
 Interior Health
 Island Health
 Northern Health
 Providence Health Care
 Vancouver Coastal Health

Province-wide health authorities in British Columbia 
 First Nations Health Authority
 Provincial Health Services Authority

References

External links
 Fraser Health website

2001 establishments in British Columbia
Health regions of British Columbia